Diego Alberto Trotta (born 13 December 1978) is an Argentine professional footballer who plays for Independiente Neuquén, as a defender.

Career
Born in Médanos, Buenos Aires, Trotta has played for Villa Mitre, Atlético Mexiquense, Salgueiros, Huracán de Tres Arroyos, Las Palmas, Alavés, Elche, Olimpo, Albacete, Godoy Cruz, Atlético Tucumán, San Martín and Bella Vista.

Trotta holds an Italian passport and played seven seasons in Spain's Segunda División as a central defender. He joined Alavés in the summer of 2003, and scored his first goal for the club against Sporting on 7 September 2003, two days after the birth of his daughter.

Arrest
On 16 April 2014, Trotta was captured on a security camera during a physical altercation with his former partner outside of her workplace in Bahía Blanca and was arrested.

References

1978 births
Living people
Argentine footballers
Association football defenders
Villa Mitre footballers
Atlético Mexiquense footballers
S.C. Salgueiros players
Huracán de Tres Arroyos footballers
UD Las Palmas players
Deportivo Alavés players
Elche CF players
Olimpo footballers
Albacete Balompié players
Godoy Cruz Antonio Tomba footballers
Atlético Tucumán footballers
San Martín de Tucumán footballers
Bella Vista de Bahía Blanca footballers
Segunda División players
Argentine Primera División players
Primera Nacional players
Argentine expatriate footballers
Expatriate footballers in Mexico
Argentine expatriate sportspeople in Mexico
Expatriate footballers in Portugal
Argentine expatriate sportspeople in Portugal
Expatriate footballers in Spain
Argentine expatriate sportspeople in Spain